Sbiba is a city surrounded by chains of mountains in the province of Kasserine.

Sbiba is in the Midwest of Tunisia on the latitude of 35° and 36°, about 70 km far from Kasserine, bounded on the north with Jedelienne, Sbeitla to the South. Sbiba was founded by the Romans. German forces defeated United States forces in the vicinity of Sbiba in an early part of the Tunisian campaign in World War II.

Geography
The city is located at the site of the ancient city of Sufes at the altitude of 630m. By the city is located the Mount Jbel Mghuila which is the highest peak in the region with 1370m.

Economy
The city is famous for its apples, tomatoes and fresh water. Sbiba produces nearly 40% of the Tunisian total production of apples and tomatoes due to its very advanced system of irrigation. Despite its population of around 55,000, Sbiba suffers from a lack of national and international investments in the fields of industry, agriculture and especially services.

References

Populated places in Kasserine Governorate
Communes of Tunisia